Copadichromis verduyni is a species of haplochromine cichlid which is endemic to Lake Malawi where it is found on the eastern shore and in the south eastern arm of the lake. It occurs in Malawi and Mozambique. This species inhabits the interface between sandy areas and rocky areas. Konings named this species after the Dutch cichlid dealer Dirk Verduyn (1942-2018).

References

verduyni
Taxa named by Ad Konings
Fish described in 1990
Taxonomy articles created by Polbot